Eugeniya Pashkova (born 19 February 1989) is a former Russian tennis player. On 7 July 2014, she reached her highest singles ranking of 373 by the Women's Tennis Association (WTA), whilst her best doubles ranking was 201 on 3 August 2009.

ITF Circuit finals

Singles: 7 (1 title, 6 runner-ups)

Doubles: 47 (34 titles, 13 runner-ups)

References

External links
 
 

1989 births
Living people
Russian female tennis players
20th-century Russian women
21st-century Russian women